Jamie Cooke (born November 5, 1968) is a Canadian American former professional ice hockey and inline hockey player. He was selected by the Philadelphia Flyers in the 7th round (140th overall) of the 1988 NHL Entry Draft.

Cooke played 13 seasons (1991 – 2004) of professional ice hockey and during the off-seasons he also played professional inline hockey from 1994 to 1999.

At the age of 44, Cooke was selected to join the United States men's national inline hockey team to compete at the 2013 Fédération Internationale de Roller Sports (FIRS) Senior Men's Inline Hockey World Championships held from July 14 – 21 in Anaheim and Huntington Beach, California, followed by the World Games 2013 held from July 24–31, 2013 in Cali, Colombia.

Awards and honors

References

External links

Jamie Cooke Team USA Inline Journey - Part 1:Tryouts

1968 births
Living people
Canadian ice hockey right wingers
Bakersfield Condors (1998–2015) players
Birmingham Bulls (ECHL) players
Colgate Raiders men's ice hockey players
Flint Generals players
Hershey Bears players
Ice hockey people from Toronto
Idaho Steelheads (WCHL) players
Las Vegas Coyotes players
Memphis RiverKings players
Orlando Jackals players
Philadelphia Bulldogs players
Philadelphia Flyers draft picks